Friends Seminary is an independent K-12 school in Manhattan within the landmarked district in the East Village.  The oldest continuously coeducational school in New York City, Friends Seminary serves 794 students in Kindergarten through Grade 12. The school's mission is to prepare students "not only for the world that is, but to help them bring about a world that ought to be." It is guided by a service mission statement and a diversity mission statement. Friends is a member of New York's Independent School Diversity Network.

Robert "Bo" Lauder is principal, the school's 35th. Lauder came to Friends in the fall of 2002 after serving as Upper School Head at Sidwell Friends School in Washington, D.C.

History

Friends Seminary, established by members of the Religious Society of Friends, whose members are known as Quakers, was founded in 1786 as Friends' Institute through a $10,000 bequest of Robert Murray, a wealthy New York merchant. It was located on Pearl Street in Manhattan and strived to provide Quaker children with a "guarded education." In 1826, the school was moved to a larger campus on Elizabeth Street. Tuition in that year was $10 or less per annum, except for the oldest students, whose families paid $20. (By 1915, tuition had risen to $250.) The school again moved in 1860 to its current location and changed its name to Friends Seminary.

In 1878, Friends Seminary was one of the earliest of schools to establish a Kindergarten. In 1925, it was the first private co-educational school to hire a full-time psychologist. M. Scott Peck, who transferred to Friends from Phillips Exeter in late 1952, praised the school's diversity and nurturing atmosphere. "While at Friends," he wrote, "I awoke each morning eager for the day ahead ... [A]t Exeter, I could barely crawl out of bed."

In 2015, based on recommendations made in 2005 by the Trustees of the New York Quarterly Meeting after completion of a study, the New York Quarterly Meeting reached consensus on the issue of incorporating the school and the New York Quarterly Meeting separately. Under the agreement, Friends Seminary will pay the New York Quarterly Meeting $775,000 annually, and both sides will contribute an additional $175,000 to a capital fund to preserve the historic buildings. The Quakers will continue naming half the members of the school’s governing board, and the agreement establishes a six-person committee to foster the school’s commitment to Quaker values.

Organization

The school is divided into three sections:

Lower School - Kindergarten to Grade 4
Middle School - Grades 5-8
Upper School - Grades 9-12

Facilities

The campus comprises six buildings. The largest building, known as Hunter Hall, built in 1964, holds classes for the entire Middle School, most of the Lower School and some of the Upper School. The building contains a basement-level gymnasium and cafeteria, library and media center, science laboratories, art studios, computer laboratories and classrooms for all grades.

Attached to the school is the historic Meetinghouse and The Fifteenth Street Monthly Meeting of The Religious Society of Friends. The Meetinghouse plays an integral part in student life at Friends Seminary. Outside the front doors of the Meetinghouse is the courtyard used for recess and other activities.

In 1997, the school purchased and renovated a former German Masonic Temple located on 15th Street. The new building, called "The Annex", incorporates "green technology" to create a building with less of an ecological footprint than many other buildings in the city.  The Annex includes more science labs, as well as three multi-use classrooms, and a black box theater.

The Meetinghouse, located on 15th Street at Rutherford Place (next to Stuyvesant Square), serves both as a place of worship and, traditionally, as a performance space, although the school has opted as of 2011 to perform in the Vineyard theatre on 15th Street.  The Meetinghouse also serves as a home for the school's music program.

Friends Seminary completed an extensive redevelopment project in 2019. They designed an entirely new structure behind the facades of three 1852 townhouses and connected them seamlessly to the School's main building. The new structure provides separate access for the Upper School, in addition to a "Great Room," which is a multipurpose gathering space that opens onto a courtyard. The new space also features an Upper School Commons and Terrace along with new classrooms are that grouped around shared study and locker areas. A rooftop Greenhouse and play area was also developed.

Cost
In addition, there are fees for meals, technology resources, etc., in combination with the expense for books for grades 9-12, that would add approximately $6,000-$8,000 to the cost of attendance.

Notable alumni
Eva Amurri, actress
Peter Bart, film producer, journalist and writer
Malcolm Browne, journalist and photographer
Henrietta Buckmaster, author
Will Menaker, podcast host, gamer, film critic
Caleb Carr, writer
Mel Cummin, cartoonist
Wylie Dufresne, chef
Lena Dunham, actress
Timothy Foote, journalist
Max Graham, music producer and DJ
Emily Wakeman Hartley, founder of the Stamford Theatre
Roger O. Hirson, dramatist and screenwriter
David Isay, radio producer
Michael Kimmelman, art critic
Hilary Knight, cartoonist
M. Scott Peck, writer
Amanda Peet, actress
Liev Schreiber, actor
Kyra Sedgwick, actress
Katharine Lamb Tait, artist
Olivia Thirlby, actress
Vera Wang, designer
William L. Ward, US Representative from New York's 16th district (1897-1899)
Nat Wolff, actor

References

External links

Educational institutions established in 1786
Quaker schools in New York (state)
1786 establishments in New York (state)
Private K-12 schools in Manhattan
Religious schools in New York (state)
Christianity in New York City
New York City Designated Landmarks in Manhattan